Jean-François Hache (1730-1796) was a French ébéniste.

References

1730 births
1796 deaths
Businesspeople from Grenoble
French furniture makers